Holy Mother may refer to:
Holy mother of Christ, an honorific of the Blessed Virgin Mary
Mother church, a title of the Christian Church in Roman Catholicism
"Holy Mother", a 1986 song by Eric Clapton from August
聖母, an honorific for an empress dowager, mother of an emperor
Sri Maa, honorific of Sarada Devi (1853–1920)
 "Holy Mother" (Fullmetal Alchemist episode), a 2004 anime
 ཇོ་མོ་གླང་མ (Quomolangma), Nepalese name for Mount Everest

See also
Heavenly Mother
Mother goddess, a deity representing nature, motherhood, or the bounty of the Earth
聖母 (disambiguation)